George Andrew Parker (20 January 1921 – 12 March 2002) was an Australian rules footballer who played with St Kilda in the Victorian Football League (VFL).

Parker served in the Australian Army during World War II.

Notes

External links 

1921 births
2002 deaths
Australian rules footballers from Western Australia
St Kilda Football Club players